This is a list of Malaysian football transfers for the 2023 first transfer window. Only transfers featuring Malaysia Super League and Malaysia M3 League are listed.

Malaysia Super League

Johor Darul Ta'zim

In:

Out:

Kelantan

In:

Out:

References

2023
Tranfers
Malaysia